"www.memory" is a song written and recorded by American country music singer Alan Jackson.  The song was released in October 2000 as the first single from his album When Somebody Loves You.  The song peaked number 6 for Jackson on the Hot Country Songs charts in early 2001.

Content
The song uses Internet terminology, such as "if you feel the need, just click on me", with Jackson directing his fictional lover to a website called "www.memory", omitting a required top-level domain. The lyric describes love gone wrong, but it adds a new twist in that the guy invites his old flame to take a stroll down memory lane via www.memory.

Critical reception
Deborah Evans Price, of Billboard magazine reviewed the song favorably, calling it a "winning little tune drenched in steel guitar and resonating with good-ole-boy country charm" She states that the lyric is "cleverly written and delivered in his usual impeccable style."

Music video
The music video features a female driving through a town in a Chrysler PT Cruiser, passing by billboards featuring Jackson's face. It was directed by Morgan Lawley.

Chart positions
"www.memory" debuted at number 46 on the U.S. Billboard Hot Country Singles & Tracks for the week of October 7, 2000.

Year-end charts

Notes

References

2000 singles
Alan Jackson songs
Songs written by Alan Jackson
Song recordings produced by Keith Stegall
Arista Nashville singles
2000 songs